Arnefrit, Arnefrid, Amefrit, or Amefrith was the son of Lupus of Friuli who claimed the Duchy of Friuli after his father's death in 666.

Lupus had been killed by the Avars, who had taken Cividale, seat of the duchy. Thus, King Grimoald had come into Friuli to remove the Avars and displace Arnefrit, who fled to the Slavs. He returned with Slav allies, but was defeated by Grimoald and died at the castle of Nimis. Grimoald appointed Wechtar in his place.

Further reading
Paul the Deacon. Historia Langobardorum. Translated by William Dudley Foulke. University of Pennsylvania: 1907.
Hodgkin, Thomas. Italy and her Invaders. Clarendon Press: 1895.
Oman, Charles. The Dark Ages 476–918. Rivingtons: London, 1914.

Year of birth missing
666 deaths
7th-century Lombard people
Lombard warriors
Dukes of Friuli
7th-century rulers in Europe